Timothy Deaux is an American songwriter and multi-instrumentalist. Deaux plays bass guitar, guitar and keyboards with The Whigs, bass guitar with Grace Potter, and guitar and percussion with Kings Of Leon. He contributed to albums by Mikky Ekko, Spanish Gold, and Rumba Shaker.

Discography
In the Dark - The Whigs, 2010
Enjoy the Company - The Whigs, 2012
Modern Creation - The Whigs, 2014
South of Nowhere - Spanish Gold, 2014
Rumba Shaker - Rumba Shaker, 2015
Live in Little Five (Live) - The Whigs, 2016
Fame - Mikky Ekko, 2018

References

External links
The Whigs' official website

American rock musicians
Living people
Year of birth missing (living people)